Amir Qureshi (born October 17, 1974) is a Pakistani football player.  He plays for the KRL FC as a goalkeeper, and was awarded PPL Goalkeeper of the Year in the 2007/08 season.

Amir was called to the national squad due to his high caliber performance, and won his first international cap during the Nepal series in 2008.

References

1974 births
Living people
Pakistani footballers
Pakistan international footballers
Association football goalkeepers